The Thermopolis Main Post Office in Thermopolis, Wyoming was built as part of a facilities improvement program by the United States Post Office Department.  The post office in Thermopolis was nominated to the National Register of Historic Places as part of a thematic study comprising twelve Wyoming post offices built to standardized USPO plans in the early twentieth century.

References

External links
 at the National Park Service's NRHP database
Thermopolis Main Post Office at the Wyoming State Historic Preservation Office

Buildings and structures in Hot Springs County, Wyoming
Beaux-Arts architecture in Wyoming
Post office buildings in Wyoming
Government buildings completed in 1933
Post office buildings on the National Register of Historic Places in Wyoming
National Register of Historic Places in Hot Springs County, Wyoming
1933 establishments in Wyoming